Vasili Vladimirovich Baskakov (born 9 September 1962) is a Russian professional football coach and a former player.

External links
 

1962 births
Living people
People from Tomsk Oblast
Soviet footballers
Russian footballers
FC Tom Tomsk players
Russian football managers
FC Tom Tomsk managers
Russian Premier League managers
Association football defenders
Sportspeople from Tomsk Oblast